Marvel: Ultimate Alliance is a 2006 action role-playing video game, developed by Raven Software for the PlayStation 2, PlayStation 3, Xbox and Xbox 360, and published by Activision. The game was ported to the PlayStation Portable and Wii by Vicarious Visions, and to Microsoft Windows by Beenox. A different Game Boy Advance version was developed by Barking Lizards Technologies. A re-release version based on Xbox 360's latest edition was developed by Zoë Mode for Windows, PlayStation 4, and Xbox One, and was released in July 2016.

Ultimate Alliance is set within the fictional Marvel Universe and features many of the superheroes, supervillains, and supporting characters that appear in publications by Marvel Comics. It shares many similarities with Raven Software's previous Marvel titles, X-Men Legends and X-Men Legends II: Rise of Apocalypse, in that it allows players to select from its vast cast to create the ultimate superhero team. The game features an original plot in which the heroes of the Marvel Universe must join forces to defeat Doctor Doom and his Masters of Evil and foil their plans for global domination.

Upon release, the game was met with largely positive reviews from critics, who praised its simple but entertaining gameplay, and its impressive selection of Marvel characters. A sequel, Marvel: Ultimate Alliance 2, was developed for multiple platforms by Vicarious Visions, n-Space and Savage Entertainment and released in 2009. A third game, Marvel Ultimate Alliance 3: The Black Order, was developed by Koei Tecmo's Team Ninja and published by Nintendo for the Nintendo Switch in July 2019.

Gameplay
Players can select teams of four from a range of more than twenty-two playable characters (although some characters are not initially available and need to be unlocked), allowing them to create their own superhero teams or recreate famous teams from the publications. Bonuses are also available if forming certain groups (e.g. the Avengers, Defenders, Fantastic Four, Marvel Knights, X-Men). The game has alternative endings, dictated by the number of optional missions the player completes. Included are trivia, artwork, and "simulator discs", which unlock non-story-related missions for characters. Each character also has a variety of costumes that offer different advantages.

Consoles, PC and PSP
The PlayStation 3 and Xbox 360 versions are virtually identical, with no major differences. Both platforms include Colossus, Moon Knight, and five additional comic book missions. Activision released eight additional downloadable characters on the Xbox 360 via the Xbox Live Marketplace on April 26, 2007 in a set of packs: a Hero Pack, consisting of Cyclops, Nightcrawler, Hawkeye, and the Hulk, and a Villain Pack, which includes Magneto, Sabretooth, Venom, and a playable Doctor Doom. Both packs are also available in a bundle pack for 800 MSP, which adds 12 new achievements to the game. The Gold Edition was released for the Xbox 360 in May 2007 which includes the standard game bundled with all downloadable content. The Platinum Hits version was released for the Xbox 360 in September 2007. The set includes all the Gold Edition of the game and a bonus DVD. As of December 2009, the DLC was removed from the Xbox LIVE Marketplace by Activision, meaning the only way to play as the downloadable characters was to purchase the Gold Edition or the Platinum Hits version. The Xbox 360 Games on Demand version now bundles the full game with all previously downloadable content.

The Wii version has a few features unique to itself including specific motion-sensitive controls for normal moves, motion-sensitive controlled special attacks (the attacks are unique for each character, but not the motions), and access to any special move at any time. This version contains no online play but has a local multiplayer mode in which up to four players may play at once. It also features the characters Colossus and Moon Knight, as well as five additional comic book missions.

The PC version is customizable, and many characters (including those exclusive to all other versions) and their modifications can be obtained from community sites for play within the game. The PC version's graphics vary depending on the customization of a user's settings. The PC version also features "intuitive mouse controls" and works with a gamepad. A number of custom characters (including Jean Grey, Psylocke, Scarlet Witch, War Machine, Vision, Dazzler, and Punisher) are available.

The re-release version of the game which came to Xbox One, PlayStation 4 and Microsoft Windows via Steam is solely based on Xbox 360’s Gold Edition. However, the re-release was initially released with the contents which were exclusive to seventh-generation consoles (PlayStation 3, Xbox 360, and Wii), but without the DLC featured originally on Xbox 360. On August 30, 2016, an update was released on these three systems which contained the eight downloadable characters previously featured on the Xbox 360.

The PSP version features simplified graphics, different characters, and extra features including the four exclusive playable Marvel characters Black Widow, Captain Marvel, Hawkeye, and Ronin. Other things unique to this version are 6 exclusive comic book missions including one which contains Swordsman, an exclusive prequel mission, and three exclusive single-player gameplay modes. Added features include online play, microphone support (voice chat), and online-recordable player statistics. The PlayStation 2 version of the game has the same features as the next-gen versions of the game, albeit without Colossus, Moon Knight and the five bonus simulator missions. In August 2007, a Greatest Hits version was released which included a bonus DVD containing a making-of featurette. The Xbox version of the game has no changes from the standard PlayStation 2 edition. However, it is possible to play as Colossus and Moon Knight via a glitch which can be accessed through a series of steps.

Game Boy Advance
The Game Boy Advance version of Ultimate Alliance features significant differences from the other console versions. Most notably, the basic gameplay takes the form of a side-scrolling fighting game with minor RPG elements, such as the ability to alter the player characters' stats. The graphics are simplified for this system and the selection of characters has also been reduced. Some additional gameplay modes were added to this version of the game including a S.H.I.E.L.D. Simulator, Time Challenges, Scavenger Hunts, and a Survival mode. Teams for this port consist of three characters and a non-playable fourth character called a "striker", who can be summoned to perform a powerful attack directed toward on-screen enemies.

Plot
The game begins with Doctor Doom and the Masters of Evil launching an attack on the S.H.I.E.L.D. Helicarrier U.N.N. Alpha. Nick Fury sends out a distress call to all available superheroes for assistance. Captain America, Spider-Man, Thor and Wolverine respond to the call. Along with the other heroes, they save the Helicarrier from the forces led by Scorpion, Bullseye, Winter Soldier, Radioactive Man, and Fin Fang Foom. In the wake of the attack, Nick Fury is given permission to start a task force to confront the Masters of Evil and Iron Man allows them to use Stark Tower as their headquarters.

Fury asks the heroes to investigate an odd message received from Dum Dum Dugan on the Omega Base, a S.H.I.E.L.D. mobile research facility. The team defeats supervillains MODOK, Crimson Dynamo, and Mysterio as well as A.I.M. Agents and failed Super Soldier experiments to prevent the Omega Base from crashing into a dam and launching several gamma bombs.

With their mission successful, the heroes travel to Atlantis, where the inhabitants are being mind-controlled by Attuma, who has usurped Namor from his throne. With the help of nano-technology that enables them to breathe and move freely underwater, the heroes fight the mind-controlled Atlanteans, destroy the towers which are guarded by Warlord Krang and Byrrah, rescue Namor, and defeat Attuma and Tiger Shark. After defeating Attuma, the heroes encounter Mandarin, who unleashes the Kraken, which the team defeats by toppling pillars on it.

They then travel to the Valley of Spirits to confront Mandarin in his palace. After his defeat, he reveals that he attempted to take command of the Masters of Evil and, upon failing, left the group. He suggests that the Mandarin they saw in the catacombs was actually Loki, Thor's adoptive brother and the god of mischief.

Upon returning to base, the team learns that Nightcrawler and Jean Grey have been kidnapped. Due to the involvement of mystical forces, Fury has the team relocated to the Sanctum Sanctorum, offered as a temporary headquarters by a grateful Doctor Strange, who they rescued in the Valley of Spirits. Professor X tracks Nightcrawler to Castle Doom, but upon trying to transport the heroes there they are sent to Murderworld by a spell from Baron Mordo. After defeating a mind-controlled Jean Grey, Rhino, and Shocker, the heroes battle a large mech, piloted by Arcade.

Victorious, the heroes learn that Doctor Doom has used Nightcrawler to access Mephisto's Realm, and the team is sent in pursuit. Upon arriving, minions of Mephisto kidnap Jean Grey and Nightcrawler. Mephisto's son Blackheart puts them in separate cages above the Infinity Vortex, stating one must be saved and the other sacrificed before the team can defeat Mephisto. During their battle with Mephisto the sacrificed hero returns, resurrected by Mephisto, but now under his control. As a final effort, the resurrected hero sacrifices their life to defeat Mephisto and allow the team to escape.

Meanwhile, in Asgard, a massive army of Super Soldiers attacks and imprisons the Asgardian gods. The heroes travel to Valhalla to liberate it from its invading force and free Heimdall (who is guarded by Rhino and Shocker), Tyr (who is guarded by Scorpion and Lizard), and Balder (who is guarded by Enchantress and Executioner). Then they fight the Wrecking Crew and undead soldiers unleashed by Hela to open Bifrost Bridge in order for reinforcements to arrive. Looking for Odin in Niffleheim following a fight with Kurse and Ulik, they find his shattered Twilight Sword and learn from Ymir that Doctor Doom and Loki have taken Odin to Raven's Spire. After Loki is seemingly defeated at Raven's Spire, the team frees the Destroyer Armor to use against Doctor Doom. Loki, disguised as Fury, reveals himself and his plot to have the heroes free the armor for nefarious purposes. As heroes defeat Loki and the armor, Doctor Doom appears and reveals that he has stolen Odin's power. He uses it to attempt to eliminate the heroes, but Uatu the Watcher saves them and transports them to the Inhumans' base on the moon.

Uatu reveals that Doom's unrestricted use of Odin's power will eventually destroy the universe and that the only way to defeat him is to acquire a piece of the M'Kraan Crystal and steal the Muonic Inducer from Galactus (who is currently attacking the Skrull homeworld).

The team is sent to the Shi'ar Empire where they fight Deathbird and the Imperial Guard in order to restore Lilandra Neramani to the throne and gain a portion of the M'Kraan Crystal. After retrieving the crystal, the heroes travel to the Skrull homeworld. With the help of the Silver Surfer, the heroes disable Galactus and steal the Muonic Inducer.

Meanwhile, Doctor Doom conquers Earth, corrupting and creating clones of many of the heroes who attempted but failed to stop him, such as Colossus and Cyclops. In a final effort, the team travels to Latveria to confront Doom. The heroes use the M'Kraan Crystal and Muonic Inducer to weaken Doom. As the heroes weaken Doom, he is blasted by a bolt of lightning sent by a rejuvenated Odin, leaving nothing but his mask behind.

As the heroes meet on the repaired Helicarrier, Fury asks Thor to thank Odin for undoing the damages to which Thor states that Odin is currently busy punishing Doctor Doom and Loki. Fury informs the heroes that the team must disband and asks if S.H.I.E.L.D. can count on them when another threat happens. Captain America assures Nick that the world can count on them.

Meanwhile, Galactus vows revenge on the heroes who stole from him and plans to destroy Earth.

Characters
Marvel: Ultimate Alliance features over 140 characters, including playable characters, bosses, and other non-player characters. Each playable character has a set of four alternate costumes, three of which must be unlocked. Some of the costumes change the character's appearance to that of a different Marvel Universe, including Iron Man as War Machine, Thor as Beta Ray Bill, Spider-Woman as Spider-Girl and Julia Carpenter from Secret Wars, Ghost Rider as Phantom Rider, and Ms. Marvel as Sharon Ventura. Most versions of the game feature 23 playable characters, with the exception of the Game Boy Advance, which only includes 14. Some systems have additional playable characters not present in other versions; notably, the Xbox 360 version received eight additional characters via downloadable content, which went on to be packaged in later printings. The 2016 re-release includes all of the characters from the Xbox 360 version, including the DLC, for a total of 33.

 Black Panther
 Black Widow
 Blade
 Captain America
 Captain Marvel
 Colossus
 Cyclops
 Daredevil
 Deadpool
 Doctor Doom
 Doctor Strange
 Elektra
 Ghost Rider
 Hawkeye
 Human Torch
 Hulk
 Iceman
 Invisible Woman
 Iron Man
 Luke Cage
 Magneto
 Mister Fantastic
 Moon Knight
 Ms. Marvel
 Nick Fury
 Nightcrawler
 Ronin
 Sabretooth
 Silver Surfer
 Spider-Man
 Spider-Woman
 Storm
 Thing
 Thor
 Venom
 Wolverine

Development and marketing

Most versions of Ultimate Alliance were developed using Vicarious Visions' Alchemy engine, which was purchased from the now-defunct Intrinsic Graphics in May 2003. Raven Software developed the primary version of the game on the PS2, PS3, Xbox and Xbox 360. Vicarious Visions simultaneously ported the game to the PSP, and later to the Wii to coincide with its launch, and Beenox ported the game to the PC. During early development Ultimate Alliance used cel-shading technology, similar to Raven's previous Marvel Comics games, X-Men Legends and X-Men Legends II: Rise of Apocalypse; however, this was dropped at some point during development. Barking Lizards Technologies used their Whiptail engine to develop the GBA version independently. The game was originally known as Marvel Legends, and had an internal working title of Marvel Comics RPG. At one point, both Link from The Legend of Zelda series and Samus Aran from the Metroid series were planned to be playable characters for the Wii version; however, both characters were removed prior to release. The music for the game was composed by Mark Griskey, Chance Thomas and Cris Velasco. Over 50 minutes of music was composed by the trio, including gameplay and cutscene tracks.

Marvel: Ultimate Alliance was first released on October 24, 2006 in North America. Regional releases followed throughout 2006 and 2007. The standard edition of Ultimate Alliance was also released as a companion with Forza Motorsport 2 in specially marked Xbox 360 consoles in 2007. The Gold Edition of the game was released on May 22, 2007 exclusively for the Xbox 360. This version included the two DLC packs available at the time. A 2016 version was released for PlayStation 4, Xbox One, and Microsoft Windows on July 26, 2016. In July 2018, the remaster of the game, along with the re-released sequel, were removed due to licensing issues from Activision. The game is currently not available to buy and download from either console or PC marketplaces, unless the user already bought the game.

Reception and awards

Reviews for Raven and Vicarious Visions' version of Marvel Ultimate Alliance received generally favorable reviews from critics. The PlayStation 3 and Xbox 360 versions received 78% and 82% at GameRankings, and 78/100 and 82/100 at Metacritic, respectively. The Windows version received an 83% at GameRankings and 82/100 at Metacritic. GameRankings' scores for the PlayStation 2, PlayStation Portable, Wii and Xbox versions were 82%, 82%, 74%, and 83%, while Metacritic scored those same consoles 81/100, 81/100, 73/100 and 83/100, respectively.

Several reviewers praised the character cast, with 1UP.com Scott Sharkey stating "even if your favorite character isn't playable, there's a good chance they'll show up at some point through the course of the story as an NPC". GameSpot Ryan Davis applauded the Xbox 360's graphics, saying that it "features a lot of great lighting, particle, and bump-mapping effects absent from the other versions". He went on to comment: "Even without those advanced graphical effects, the PC and Xbox versions still look pretty sharp". Game Informer thought the game improved upon the "excellent X-Men Legends games from which it was born", giving the game a 9.25/10.

The Game Boy Advance version received the poorest reception. GameSpot thought poorly of the game, calling "uninteresting and sloppy", and rating the game a 2.5/10 "terrible". IGN also disliked the game, giving it a 2.0/10. Reviewer Chris Adams stated: "Everything is awful. From sprites to backgrounds to effects, it shames the Marvel license". Gamer 2.0 gave the game an 8.1/10, however, citing a large number of bonus missions and unlockables as incentive to play.

Sequels

A sequel to Marvel: Ultimate Alliance was announced by Activision on February 8, 2008. It was released in North America on September 15, 2009, and follows closely the events of the Civil War storyline: an explosion in Stamford, Connecticut caused by a supervillain prompts a Superhuman Registration Act. In the game, players are able to choose between the Pro-Registration side, headed by Iron Man, or the Anti-Registration side, headed by Captain America up to the point where the heroes end up uniting against a new common enemy called The Fold.

Marvel Ultimate Alliance 3: The Black Order was announced at The Game Awards on December 6, 2018. The game was developed by Koei Tecmo's Team Ninja and published by Nintendo for Nintendo Switch on July 19, 2019. The game is a reboot of the series, set in a different continuity from the first two games, and involves a team of heroes uniting to prevent Thanos and the Black Order from collecting the Infinity Stones.

Notes

References

External links

 

2006 video games
Action role-playing video games
Activision games
Beenox games
Cooperative video games
Crossover role-playing video games
Game Boy Advance games
Marvel Entertainment franchises
Marvel Ultimate Alliance
Multiplayer and single-player video games
PlayStation 2 games
PlayStation 3 games
PlayStation 4 games
PlayStation Portable games
Superhero crossover video games
Vicarious Visions games
Video games based on Marvel Comics
Video games developed in Canada
Video games developed in the United Kingdom
Video games scored by Alexander Brandon
Video games scored by Chance Thomas
Video games scored by Cris Velasco
Video games scored by Mark Griskey
Video games set in a fictional country
Video games set in Atlantis
Video games set in China
Video games set in Europe
Video games set in New York City
Video games set on fictional planets
Wii games
Windows games
Xbox games
Xbox 360 games
Xbox One games
Video games developed in the United States
Barking Lizards games
Zoë Mode games